O'Neil Ray Collins (9 March 1931 - April 8, 1989) was an American botanist, mycologist, and specialist in slime-mold genetics.

Early life
Collins was born in Plaisance, Louisiana in 1931, and graduated from the local high school in 1948. After serving the United States Army in Europe,  he earned his bachelor of science degree in botany in January 1957 from Southern University. His interest in mycology was cultivated by Lafayette Frederick, a professor at Southern. Collins later attended the University of Iowa and studied under Constantine J. Alexopoulos, receiving his master's in 1959 and doctorate in 1961. His thesis involved the study of slime-molds in the genera Physarum and Didymium.

Career
In 1961 Collins began his teaching career at Queens College. He concurrently conducted research on Didymium with Ian Kenneth Ross at Yale. Collins accepted a faculty position at Southern University in 1963, and in 1965, he moved to Wayne State University in Detroit.

In 1968, Collins became the first black faculty member in the Botany Department of the University of California, Berkeley. He was Associate Dean of the Graduate Division and helped develop the Graduate Minority Program. He became a Miller Research Professor in 1974, and served as Chairman of the Department of Botany from 1976 to 1981.

Collins died in 1989. At the time of his death, he was the only African-American biologist to have held a tenured position at Berkeley.

References

American mycologists
1931 births
1989 deaths
African-American biologists
African-American academics
Southern University alumni
University of Iowa alumni
University of California, Berkeley faculty
20th-century African-American people